Xenacanthus (from Ancient Greek ξένος, xénos, 'foreign, alien' + ἄκανθος, akanthos, 'spine') is a genus of prehistoric sharks. The first species of the genus lived in the later Devonian period, and they survived until the end of the Triassic, 202 million years ago. Fossils of various species have been found worldwide.

Description 
Xenacanthus had a number of features that distinguished it from modern sharks. The dorsal fin was ribbonlike and ran the entire length of the back and round the tail, where it joined with the anal fin. This arrangement resembles that of modern conger eels, and Xenacanthus probably swam in a similar manner. A distinctive spine projected from the back of the head and gave the genus its name. The spike has even been speculated to have been venomous, perhaps in a similar manner to a sting ray. This is quite plausible as the rays are close relatives to the sharks. The teeth had an unusual "V" shape, and it probably fed on small crustaceans and heavily scaled palaeoniscid fishes.

As with all fossil sharks, Xenacanthus is mainly known because of fossilised teeth and spines.

Species 

 X. texensis
 X. atriossis
 X. compressus
 X. decheni
 X. denticulatus
 X. erectus
 X. gibbosus
 X. gracilis
 X. howsei
 X. laevissimus
 X. latus
 X. luedernesis
 X. moorei - found in the lower levels of the Chinle Formation, New Mexico, United States
 X. ossiani
 X. ovalis
 X. parallelus
 X. parvidens
 X. ragonhai - Rio do Rasto Formation, Brazil
 X. robustus
 X. serratus
 X. slaughteri
 X. taylori

References

External links 
 
 

Prehistoric shark genera
Prehistoric cartilaginous fish genera
Devonian cartilaginous fish
Carboniferous cartilaginous fish
Permian cartilaginous fish
Triassic cartilaginous fish
Rhaetian extinctions
Prehistoric fish of Asia
Triassic fish of Europe
Prehistoric fish of North America
Prehistoric fish of South America
Permian Brazil
Fossils of Brazil
Fossil taxa described in 1848